The Boston Bruins are a professional ice hockey team based in Boston, Massachusetts. They are members of the Atlantic Division in the Eastern Conference of the National Hockey League (NHL) and are one of the Original Six teams of the league. Founded in 1924, they are the league's third-oldest team and the oldest team based in the United States, with 2021–22 season marking the 98th year for the franchise. As of the end of their 2021–22 season, the Bruins have won 3,292 regular season games, accumulated 26 division championships and five conference championships, led the league in points fourteen times, appeared in the playoffs 75 times and won six Stanley Cup titles.

Table keys

Year by year

Notes
From the 1924–25 season through the 1925–26 season, the NHL had no divisions.
From the 1926–27 season through the 1937–38 season, Boston played in the American Division.
From the 1938–39 season through the 1966–67 season, the NHL had no divisions.
Prior to the 1967–68 season, the NHL split into East and West Divisions because of the addition of six expansion teams.
The NHL realigned prior to the 1974–75 season. The Bruins were placed in the Prince of Wales Conference's Adams Division.
The NHL realigned into Eastern and Western conferences prior to the 1993–94 season. Boston was placed in the Northeast Division of the Eastern Conference.
The season was shortened to 48 games because of the 1994–95 NHL lockout.
Beginning with the 1999–2000 season, teams received one point for losing a regular season game in overtime.
The season was cancelled because of the 2004–05 NHL lockout.
Prior to the 2005–06 season, the NHL instituted a penalty shootout for regular season games that remained tied after a five-minute overtime period, which prevented ties.
The season was shortened to 48 games because of the 2012–13 NHL lockout.
The NHL realigned prior to the 2013–14 season. The Bruins were placed in the Atlantic Division of the Eastern Conference.
The regular season was suspended on March 12, 2020 due to the COVID-19 pandemic, and officially concluded on May 26, 2020, with the announcement of a 24-team expanded playoff to be held in the summer. The Bruins played 70 of their scheduled 82 games, and having secured the highest point percentage in the eastern conference, were one of the four teams to play in a three-game round-robin to determine seeding for the first round.
Due to the COVID-19 pandemic, the 2020–21 NHL season was shortened to 56 games.

References

 
Sea
National Hockey League team seasons
Boston Bruins